Taseralik Culture Center is a cultural center in Sisimiut, a town in western Greenland, the second-largest town in the country. Located in the eastern part of Sisimiut, on the shore of the small Nalunnguarfik lake, Taseralik is the second such center in Greenland, after Katuaq in Nuuk, the capital.

Activity 
The center hosts art exhibitions, traveling theatre troupes, movies, and concerts, from classical to folk music. The Sisimiut Culture Day on 21 November is also celebrated at Taseralik.

References

Buildings and structures in Greenland
Greenlandic culture
Sisimiut
Tourist attractions in Greenland